The Central Committee (CC) composition was elected by the 7th Congress, and sat from 8 March 1918 until 23 March 1919. The CC 1st Plenary Session renewed the composition of the Bureau, Secretariat and the Organizational Bureau (OB) of the Russian Communist Party (Bolsheviks).

Plenary sessions

Composition

Members

Candidates

References

General

Plenary sessions, apparatus heads, ethnicity (by clicking on the individual names on "The Central Committee elected by the VIIth Congress of the RCP (B) 03.08.1918 members" reference), the Central Committee full- and candidate membership, Bureau membership, Secretariat membership and Orgburo membership were taken from these sources:

Bibliography

Sources

Central Committee of the Communist Party of the Soviet Union
1918 establishments in Russia
1919 disestablishments in Russia